Tughlakabad railway station (station code:- TKD) is on the Kanpur–Tundla–Agra–Delhi line.  It is located in the Indian union territory of Delhi. It is operated by Northern Railway, Delhi railway division.

History
The Agra–Delhi chord was opened in 1904. Some parts of it were relaid during the construction of New Delhi (inaugurated in 1927–28).

Passengers
Tughlakabad railway station serves around 33,000 passengers every day.

Suburban railway
Tughlakabad is part of the Delhi Suburban Railway and is served by EMU trains.

Metro link
Tughlakabad metro station is about 1 km from Tughlakabad railway station. It is on the Violet Line of Delhi Metro. The line operates underground from Kashmere gate till Jangpura metro station. From there it is an elevated line till Raja Nahar Singh (Ballabhgarh) metro station. The Violet Line was opened up to Sarita Vihar in 2010 and up to Badarpur in 2011.

Loco sheds
Tughlakabad Diesel Loco Shed houses WDM-2, WDM-3A, WDM-3C, WDM-3D, WDP-1, WDP-3A, WDP-4B, WDP-4D, WAP-1 & WAP-4. It has more than 150 locos.

Tughlakabad Electric Loco Shed is a West Central Railway shed located in Northern Railway territory. It was a Western Railway shed till 2003. It was originally built to serve freight traffic on the busy Delhi–Mumbai route. It houses more than 250 locos of WAP-7 and WAG-9.

Yards and depots
Tughlakabad marshalling yard is a mechanized hump yard with retarders.  It has an Inland Container depot with container freight station and also a domestic container terminal.

References

External links

Railway stations in South Delhi district
Delhi railway division
Railway stations opened in 1904